Craig Clark (born 1960 in Santa Monica, California) is an American animator, an art rock, darkwave musician (Chorus of Souls on Fluxus Records), a comic book artist (Nemesister and Astrothrill), and an album cover artist (The Nymphs on Geffen Records).

Biography 
Clark began his career as a child actor at the age of 8, when he starred in an educational film called "Forgive and Forget" directed by voice actor Shep Menken in 1968. Switching to animation at age 14, he was discovered by animators Corny Cole (Looney Tunes) and Duane Crowther (Yellow Submarine), and was mentored by longtime Disney animator Amby Paliwoda. Clark was one of the original animation and layout artists on the first three seasons of The Simpsons, and has gone on to animate on various other animated projects such as several Peanuts TV specials for Bill Melendez productions, and many special effects  feature films, such as Forrest Gump, The Mask, Godzilla, An American Tail: Fievel Goes West, Big Trouble in Little China, Cool World, and Poltergeist II: The Other Side.

Clark has produced and directed The Kustomonsters animated show for the web and TV through Cheeky Entertainment, and has aired on AMGTV in U.S. syndication and also streaming TV service OSI74. Clark also released a Kustomonsters feature film via Vimeo ON Demand in 2015. A second Kustomonsters feature, Kustomonsters 2, was released on OSI74 on Roku in 2020.

Filmography

Published works 
 Nemesister (1997) (Cheeky Press)
 Astrothrill (1999) (comicbook/CD) (Fluxus Records)
 and

External links 
 
 
– Toon In Podcast Interview

1960 births
Living people
Animators from California
Artists from Santa Monica, California
Musicians from Santa Monica, California
Art rock musicians
American rock musicians
American comics artists
Album-cover and concert-poster artists
Special effects people